Abels may refer to:

People
Abels (surname)

Companies and organizations
Abels Shipbuilders, based in Bristol, England
Abels Moving Services, of Suffolk, England

Places
Abels Harbour, Newfoundland and Labrador
Earl Abel's, a restaurant in Texas

Music
Cains & Abels, an American musical group

Mathematics
Abel's test, a mathematical test
Abel's theorem, a mathematical theorem
Abel's identity, a mathematical equation
Abel's inequality, a mathematical parameter

Fiction
Abel's Island, a children's novel
Abel's Island (film), an animated film based on the book